Anna Werblińska (née Barańska) (born 14 May 1984) is a Polish volleyball player, a member of Poland women's national volleyball team in 2006–2016, a participant of the Olympic Games Beijing 2008, a bronze medalist of European Championship 2009, and four-time Polish Champion (2007, 2010, 2014, 2015).

Personal life
On 19 June 2010 she married Sebastian Werbliński. In November 2017 she announced that she is expecting their first child.

Her sister Bogumiła (born 1986) is also a volleyball player.

Career

National team
In October 2009 Werblińska won with her teammates the bronze medal of European Championship 2009 after winning a match against Germany. She took part in the first edition of the European Games. In the semifinals her national team beat Serbia and qualified to the final match. On 27 June 2015 Poland was beaten by Turkey, and Werblińska with her teammates won the silver medal.

Sporting achievements

Clubs

CEV Cup
  2012/2013 - with Bank BPS Muszynianka Fakro Muszyna

National championships
 2005/2006  Polish Championship, with Winiary Kalisz
 2006/2007  Polish Cup, with Winiary Kalisz
 2006/2007  Polish Championship, with Winiary Kalisz
 2007/2008  Polish Championship, with Winiary Kalisz
 2008/2009  Polish Cup, with BKS Stal Bielsko-Biała
 2008/2009  Polish Championship, with BKS Stal Bielsko-Biała
 2009/2010  Polish Championship, with BKS Stal Bielsko-Biała
 2010/2011  Polish SuperCup 2010, with BKS Stal Bielsko-Biała
 2010/2011  Polish Championship, with BKS Stal Bielsko-Biała
 2011/2012  Polish SuperCup 2011, with Bank BPS Muszynianka Fakro Muszyna
 2011/2012  Polish Championship, with Bank BPS Muszynianka Fakro Muszyna
 2012/2013  Polish Championship, with Bank BPS Muszynianka Fakro Muszyna
 2013/2014  Polish Cup, with KPS Chemik Police
 2013/2014  Polish Championship, with KPS Chemik Police
 2014/2015  Polish SuperCup 2014, with KPS Chemik Police
 2014/2015  Polish Championship, with KPS Chemik Police

National team
 2001  CEV U18 European Championship
 2001  FIVB U18 World Championship
 2002  CEV U20 European Championship
 2003  FIVB U20 World Championship
 2009  CEV European Championship
 2015  European Games

Individually
 2001 CEV U18 European Championship - Best Spiker
 2002 CEV U20 European Championship - Best Defender
 2007 Polish Cup - Best Server
 2009 Polish Cup - Most Valuable Player
 2010 Polish Sportspersonality of the Year 2009 - 9th place
 2013 CEV Cup - Best Receiver
 2014 Polish Cup - Most Valuable Player
 2014 Polish Championship - - Most Valuable Player
 2015 Polish Cup - Best Receiver

References

1984 births
Living people
People from Świdnica
Sportspeople from Lower Silesian Voivodeship
Polish women's volleyball players
Olympic volleyball players of Poland
Volleyball players at the 2008 Summer Olympics
Volleyball players at the 2015 European Games
European Games medalists in volleyball
European Games silver medalists for Poland
21st-century Polish women